The Minnesota Correctional Facility – Rush City is a prison for men operated by the Minnesota Department of Corrections in Rush City, Chisago County, Minnesota.  

Rush City is the state's newest prison, opened in February 2000.  The $90 million project stands as the largest single structure in the county, employs about 350 workers, and at the ten-year mark in 2010 was reported to have met local expectations as a quiet and relatively well-run prison.

But in June 2010, 27-year-old inmate Xavius Scullark-Johnson died after a string of overnight seizures while held in Rush City, where he was denied emergency medical care.  In deteriorating health for months, he anticipated his own death in letters to his mother.    His family sued the Department of Corrections, the contracted health care provider Corizon, and the individuals involved.   The DOC agreed to settle the suit for $400,000 and promised additional training.

References

Prisons in Minnesota
Buildings and structures in Chisago County, Minnesota
2000 establishments in Minnesota